Embers (German: Glut) is a 1983 Swiss-West German drama film co-written and directed by Thomas Koerfer. The film was entered into the main competition at the 40th edition of the Venice Film Festival.

Plot

Cast 
 
 Armin Mueller-Stahl as François Korb / Andres Korb
 Katharina Thalbach as Claire Korb
 Matthias Habich as Albert Korb
 Krystyna Janda as Anna
 Sigfrit Steiner  as Obert Wettach
  Thomas Lücking as Andres
 Agnes Zielinski as 	Anna
  Barbara Freier  as Antonia

References

External links
  

1983 films
Swiss drama films
German drama films
1983 drama films